"Jete Nahi Dibo" (English: "I Won't Let You Go" or "You Must Not Go") is a Bengali poem written by Rabindranath Tagore. The poem is included in the collection Sonar Tori (IPA:). The poem consists of 176 lines. The English translation of the poem is curtailed into 16 lines.

Synopsis 
In this poem, the poet is ready to depart his home to return to his workplace after the vacation of Durga Puja. His 4-year-old daughter does not want him to go. The poet consoles her and explains that it is really important for him to return to his workplace. However, the child denies to understand this and keeps on saying "I won't let you go".

References

External links 
 Poem on Bengali Wikisource 

Poems by Rabindranath Tagore
Poems
Bengali-language poems
Indian poems